KF Vllaznimi is a football club based in Struga, North Macedonia. The club currently competes in the Macedonian Third League (Southwest Division).

History
In 1947 a group of young enthusiasts began activities to found a football club, where they could play during holidays and organize tournaments. Unanimously they decided to represent themselves by the name of the Albanian hero "Emin Duraku". In 1974 for political reasons, they gave the club a new name KF "Vllaznimi" meaning brotherhood. Since then the name "Vllaznimi" remains as it is. The club's official colors are blue and they have been like that since they were first formed.
Chairman of this club is Naser Sinani , and currently the club is managed by Fiat Shate .

External links
FK Vlaznimi on Facebook 
Club info at MacedonianFootball 
Football Federation of Macedonia 

Vlaznimi
Association football clubs established in 1947
1947 establishments in the Socialist Republic of Macedonia
Sport in Struga
Vllaznimi